I Love My Family is a Chinese sitcom. It was China's first multi-camera sitcom and it originally aired from 1993 to 1994 with a total of 120 episodes. It is also the first Mandarin-language sitcom. It was directed by Ying Da and Lin Cong and written primarily by Liang Zuo and Wang Shuo. It was produced by Beijing Red Green Blue TV and Commercials Center.

It was inspired by the popularity of Mandarin-dubbed episodes of Growing Pains as well as the family-centered premise. It is regarded as a "milestone of Chinese TV comedy", and its director, Ying Da, is acclaimed as the "godfather of Chinese sitcom", and "China's Norman Lear" by foreigners. Although it is a sitcom, each scene plays like a skit, combining humour and emotional content. It is notable for having a theatre-experienced cast performing in front of a live studio audience.

Wen Xingyu (The sole senior of the cast) was regarded as the central star of the show due to his relaxing personality and screen presence.

Director Ying Da would later helm several multi-camera comedies and dramas, including the 2013 spiritual successor We Are a Family (我们一家人).

References

External links 
 I Love My Family at the Internet Movie Database.

1993 Chinese television series debuts
Chinese television sitcoms
Mandarin-language television shows